The Cadiz Masonic Lodge No. 121 F. and A.M., at Jefferson and Monroe Sts. in Cadiz, Kentucky, was built around 1854.  It was listed on the National Register of Historic Places in 1979.

It is a rectangular brick building on an ashlar stone foundation.

In 1998 the building was included in the Cadiz Downtown Historic District, and was described as an "example of Greek Revival at its simplest."

In 2014 it was serving as Trigg County Historical Museum.

References

National Register of Historic Places in Trigg County, Kentucky
Cultural infrastructure completed in 1854
Museums in Trigg County, Kentucky
Former Masonic buildings in Kentucky
History museums in Kentucky
1854 establishments in Kentucky
Clubhouses on the National Register of Historic Places in Kentucky
Greek Revival architecture in Kentucky
Masonic Lodge No. 121 F. and A.M.
Individually listed contributing properties to historic districts on the National Register in Kentucky